Mrs. Dane's Danger is a 1916 American silent drama film directed by Wilfrid North.
The film featured Lillian Walker, Wilfrid North, Donald Hall, William Dunn and L. Rogers Lytton in the lead roles.

Cast 
Lillian Walker as Alice Dane
Wilfrid North as David Dane
Donald Hall as Rex Gordon
 William Dunn as Jasper Dicey
L. Rogers Lytton as Simon Corey

References

External links 

American silent feature films
Vitagraph Studios films
1916 drama films
1916 films
Silent American drama films
American black-and-white films
1910s English-language films
Films directed by Wilfrid North
1910s American films